This is a list of 1981 British incumbents.

Government
 Monarch
 Head of State — Elizabeth II, Queen of the United Kingdom (1952–2022)
 Prime Minister
 Head of Government — Margaret Thatcher, Prime Minister of the United Kingdom (1979–1990)
First Lord of the Treasury
 Margaret Thatcher, First Lord of the Treasury (1979–1990)
Chancellor of the Exchequer
 Sir Geoffrey Howe, Chancellor of the Exchequer (1979–1983)
Second Lord of the Treasury
 Sir Geoffrey Howe, Second Lord of the Treasury (1979–1983)
Secretary of State for Foreign and Commonwealth Affairs
 Peter Carington, 6th Baron Carrington, Secretary of State for Foreign and Commonwealth Affairs (1979–1982)
Secretary of State for the Home Department
 William Whitelaw, Secretary of State for the Home Department (1979–1983)
Secretary of State for Transport
 Norman Fowler, Minister for Transport (1979–1981)
 Norman Fowler, Secretary of State for Transport (1981)
 David Howell, Secretary of State for Transport (1981–1983)
Secretary of State for Scotland
 George Younger, Secretary of State for Scotland (1979–1986)
Secretary of State for Social Services
 Patrick Jenkin, Secretary of State for Social Services (1979–1981)
 Norman Fowler, Secretary of State for Social Services (1981–1987)
Secretary of State for Northern Ireland
 Humphrey Atkins, Secretary of State for Northern Ireland (1979–1981)
 James Prior, Secretary of State for Northern Ireland (1981–1984)
Secretary of State for Defence
 Francis Pym, Secretary of State for Defence (1979–1981)
 John Nott, Secretary of State for Defence (1981–1983)
Secretary of State for Industry
 Sir Keith Joseph, Bt., Secretary of State for Industry (1979–1981)
 Patrick Jenkin, Secretary of State for Industry (1981–1983)
Secretary of State for Trade
 John Nott, Secretary of State for Trade (1979–1981)
 John Biffen, Secretary of State for Trade (1981–1982)
Secretary of State for Education and Science
 Mark Carlisle, Secretary of State for Education and Science (1979–1981)
 Sir Keith Joseph, Bt., Secretary of State for Education and Science (1981–1986)
Secretary of State for Wales
 Nicholas Edwards, Secretary of State for Wales (1979–1987)
Lord Privy Seal
 Sir Ian Gilmour, Lord Privy Seal (1979–1981)
 Humphrey Atkins, Lord Privy Seal (1981–1982)
Leader of the House of Commons
 Norman St John-Stevas, Leader of the House of Commons (1979–1981)
 Francis Pym, Leader of the House of Commons (1981–1982)
Lord President of the Council
 Christopher Soames, Baron Soames, Lord President of the Council (1979–1981)
 Francis Pym, Lord President of the Council (1981–1982)
Lord Chancellor
 Quintin Hogg, Baron Hailsham of St Marylebone, Lord Chancellor (1979–1987)
Chancellor of the Duchy of Lancaster
 Norman Arthur Francis St John-Stevas, Chancellor of the Duchy of Lancaster (1979–1981)
 Janet Mary Young, Baroness Young, Chancellor of the Duchy of Lancaster (1981–1982)

Religion
 Archbishop of Canterbury
 Robert Runcie, Archbishop of Canterbury (1980–1991)
 Archbishop of York
 Stuart Blanch, Archbishop of York (1975–1983)

1981
Leaders
British incumbents